Sedan is an unincorporated community in Appanoose County, Iowa, United States.

History
Sedan was located at the junction of two railroads. In 1878, Sedan contained two businesses: a store and saloon under one roof, and a depot building.

Sedan's population was 27 in 1925.

References

Unincorporated communities in Appanoose County, Iowa
Unincorporated communities in Iowa